Maryland House of Delegates District 37A is one of the 67 districts that compose the Maryland House of Delegates. Along with subdistrict 37B, it makes up the 37th district of the Maryland Senate. District 37A includes parts of Dorchester and Wicomico Counties, and is represented by one delegate.

Demographic characteristics 
As of the 2020 United States census, the district had a population of 43,123, of whom 32,129 (74.5%) were of voting age. The racial makeup of the district was 14,660 (34.0%) White, 22,766 (52.8%) African American, 237 (0.5%) Native American, 616 (1.4%) Asian, 10 (0.0%) Pacific Islander, 1,974 (4.6%) from some other race, and 2,860 (6.6%) from two or more races. Hispanic or Latino of any race were 3,611 (8.4%) of the population.

The district had 25,349 registered voters as of October 17, 2020, of whom 4,284 (16.9%) were registered as unaffiliated, 15,318 (60.4%) were registered as Democrats, 5,341 (21.1%) were registered as Republicans, and 243 (1.0%) were registered to other parties.

Past Election Results

2002

2006

2010

2014

2018

References 

37A